Wellington Baroni (born April 1, 1989, in Curitiba), is a Brazilian professional footballer who plays  for PSTC in Brazil, as a defender.

References

1989 births
Living people
Brazilian footballers
Association football defenders
Paraná Clube players
Brazilian expatriate footballers
Expatriate footballers in Romania
Brazilian expatriate sportspeople in Romania
Club Atlético River Plate (Montevideo) players
Association football midfielders
Footballers from Curitiba